Camonea umbellata, commonly known as hogvine, yellow merremia, and yellow wood rose, is a thin vine growing to a maximum thickness of . It has many uses in Indian traditional medicines. The flowers attract bees, butterflies and birds.

References

External links
Description

umbellata
Taxa named by Carl Linnaeus